Asura creatina is a moth of the family Erebidae. It is found on Sulawesi and Java.

References

creatina
Moths described in 1879
Moths of Indonesia